Barry Clayton Black (born November 1, 1948) is the 62nd chaplain of the United States Senate. He began serving as Senate chaplain on June 27, 2003, becoming the first African American and first Seventh-day Adventist to hold the office.

Black served for over 27 years in the United States Navy Chaplain Corps, rising to the rank of rear admiral (upper half) and ending his career as the Chief of Chaplains of the United States Navy. He retired from the Navy on August 15, 2003.

Naval career
Commissioned as a Navy chaplain in 1976, Black's first duty station was the Fleet Religious Support Activity in Norfolk, Virginia.

As a rear admiral, he received the Navy Distinguished Service Medal, the Legion of Merit Medal, the Defense Meritorious Service Medal twice, the Meritorious Service Medal twice, the Navy Commendation Medal twice, the Marine Corps Commendation Medal, and numerous unit awards, campaign, and service medals.

United States Senate chaplain
On June 27, 2003, Black was chosen as the 62nd chaplain of the United States Senate. He began the job on July 7, 2003.

During the 16-day United States federal government shutdown of 2013, Black's invocations began to garner widespread national attention. On October 1, the first day of the shutdown, he prayed for divine guidance to "strengthen our weakness, replacing cynicism with faith and cowardice with courage". On October 3, he prayed, "Save us from the madness. We acknowledge our transgressions, our shortcomings, our smugness, our selfishness and our pride... Deliver us from the hypocrisy of attempting to sound reasonable while being unreasonable."

During his prayer on October 4, the day after officers from the U.S. Capitol Police shot and killed a woman who had used her car in an attempt to breach federal grounds, Black noted that the officers were not being paid because of the shutdown. Like other government workers, he too was unpaid during the shutdown, saying, "I'm being remunerated from above. And that's pretty special." On the fourth day of the shutdown, he also prayed, of the senators, "Remove from them that stubborn pride which imagines itself to be above and beyond criticism. Forgive them the blunders they have committed."

On day nine, prompted by news of the delay of death benefits for military families, Black prayed, "It's time for our lawmakers to say 'Enough is enough'", and asked that God "cover our shame with the robe of Your righteousness." On day 11, Black prayed to "give our lawmakers the wisdom to distinguish between truth and error... Give them a hatred of all hypocrisy, deceit and shame as they seek to replace them with gentleness, patience and truth."

The U.S. House of Representatives, which has its own chaplain, also invited Black to deliver an invocation in their chamber.

Awards
In 1995, Black was chosen from 127 nominees for the NAACP Renowned Service Award for his contributions to equal opportunity and civil rights.

In 2002, he received the Benjamin Elijah Mays Distinguished Leadership Award from the Morehouse School of Religion. In 2004, the Old Dominion University chapter of the NAACP conferred on him the Image Award, "Reaffirming the Dream - Realizing the Vision", for military excellence.

On May 23, 2019, Black was awarded the Becket's 2019 Canterbury Medal for his defense of religious liberty for people of all faiths.

Education
Black is an alumnus of Oakwood University, Andrews University, North Carolina Central University, Eastern Baptist Seminary (now known as Palmer Theological Seminary), Salve Regina University, and the United States International University (now known as Alliant International University).

In addition to earning three Master of Arts degrees in divinity, counseling, and management, Black holds two earned doctorates: a Doctorate of Ministry and a Ph.D. in psychology. In 2004, he also received an honorary Doctorate of Divinity degree from La Sierra University.

Publication
Black's autobiography, From the Hood to the Hill, was published in 2006. He has explained its title as follows:

In popular culture

As a result of the attention his invocations received during the federal government shutdown, Black was parodied on NBC's Saturday Night Live. Playing Black during the show's "Weekend Update" segment that aired on October 12, 2013, SNL cast member Kenan Thompson prayed, "Lord, bless and forgive these braying jackasses." Thompson's Black prayed, "May they find themselves in a restroom stall devoid of toilet paper."

When approached for a reaction, Black responded that, while he had not seen it, he was a fan of the show and did not object to the parody. "It's all in good humor", he said. "If you're doing something constructive enough that you're part of their cartoons, that's a great honor."

Personal life
Black is a native of Baltimore, Maryland. His mother was a domestic and his father was a long-distance truck driver "and something of a nomad." He is one of eight children.

He is married to Brenda Black, née Pearsall, of St. Petersburg, Florida. They have three sons: Barry II, Brendan, and Bradford.

Black is a vegetarian. He has said, "that is not something that is a test of fellowship in my church. I'm a vegetarian because I grew up that way and I believe it's a rather healthy lifestyle."

References

External links

United States Senate – Barry Black
United States Navy Chaplain Corps – Rear Admiral Black's Remarks at His Retirement as Chief of Navy Chaplains

C-SPAN Q&A interview with Black, October 25, 2009
2007 PBS interview with Barry C. Black
June 22, 2007 PBS interview of Barry C. Black
Barry C. Black: Dialogue with an Adventist chaplain in the U.S. Navy Retrieved October 8, 2018
Barry Black – From the Hood to the Hill - Interview on The Incredible Journey TV with Gary Kent, January 15, 2021

|-

1948 births
Living people
Oakwood University alumni
Andrews University alumni
20th-century Christian clergy
21st-century American politicians
21st-century Christian clergy
African-American United States Navy personnel
Chaplains of the United States Senate
Chiefs of Chaplains of the United States Navy
Christian vegetarianism
Military personnel from Baltimore
North Carolina Central University alumni
Palmer Theological Seminary alumni
Recipients of the Legion of Merit
Religious leaders from Baltimore
Salve Regina University alumni
American Seventh-day Adventist ministers
Seventh-day Adventist religious workers
United States International University alumni